The following are the winners of the 29th annual Origins Award, held in 2003:

Hall of Fame inductees
 Larry Bond
 Bob Charrette
 Ed Greenwood
 Reiner Knizia
 Klaus Teuber
 Loren Wiseman

Hall of Fame Game inductees
 Squad Leader
 Warhammer 40K

External links
 Origins Award Winners for 2003 and Hall of Fame Inductees

2003 awards
 
2003 awards in the United States